Paarijaatham is a 1976 Indian Malayalam-language film,  directed by Mansoor and produced by R. Somanathan. The film stars Prem Nazir, Kaviyoor Ponnamma, Adoor Bhasi and Jose Prakash. The film has musical score by M. K. Arjunan.

Cast

Prem Nazir
Kaviyoor Ponnamma
Adoor Bhasi
Jose Prakash
Sreelatha Namboothiri
Alummoodan
Meena
Vidhubala

Soundtrack
The music was composed by M. K. Arjunan with lyrics by Sreekumaran Thampi.

References

External links
 

1976 films
1970s Malayalam-language films